A payment system is any system used to settle financial transactions through the transfer of monetary value. This includes the institutions, instruments, people, rules, procedures, standards, and technologies that make its exchange possible. A common type of payment system, called an operational network, links bank accounts and provides for monetary exchange using bank deposits. Some payment systems also include credit mechanisms, which are essentially a different aspect of payment.

Payment systems are used in lieu of tendering cash in domestic and international transactions. This consists of a major service provided by banks and other financial institutions. Traditional payment systems include negotiable instruments such as drafts (e.g., cheques) and documentary credits such as letters of credit.  With the advent of computers and electronic communications, many alternative electronic payment systems have emerged. The term electronic payment refers to a payment made from one bank account to another using electronic methods and forgoing the direct intervention of bank employees. Narrowly defined electronic payment refers to e-commerce—a payment for buying and selling goods or services offered through the Internet, or broadly to any type of electronic funds transfer.

Modern payment systems use cash-substitutes as compared to traditional payment systems. This includes debit cards, credit cards, electronic funds transfers, direct credits, direct debits, internet banking and e-commerce payment systems.

Payment systems may be physical or electronic and each has its own procedures and protocols. Standardization has allowed some of these systems and networks to grow to a global scale, but there are still many country-specific and product-specific systems. Examples of payment systems that have become globally available are credit card and automated teller machine (ATM) networks. Additionally, forms exist to transfer funds between financial institutions. Domestically this is accomplished by using Automated clearing house (ACH) and real-time gross settlement (RTGS) systems. Internationally this is accomplished using the SWIFT network.

Domestic
An efficient national payment system reduces the cost of exchanging goods, services, and assets. It is indispensable to the functioning of the interbank, money, and capital markets. A weak payment system may severely drag on the stability and developmental capacity of a national economy. Such failures can result in inefficient use of financial resources, inequitable risk-sharing among agents, actual losses for participants, and loss of confidence in the financial system and in the very use of money. The technical efficiency of the payment system is important for the development of the economy.

An automated clearing house (ACH) system processes transactions in batches, storing, and transmitting them in groups. An ACH is considered a net settlement system, which means settlement may be delayed. This poses what is known as settlement risk.

Real-time gross settlement systems (RTGS) are funds transfer systems where the transfer of money or securities takes place from one bank to another on a "real-time" and on "gross" basis. Settlement in "real time" means that payment transaction does not require any waiting period. The transactions are settled as soon as they are processed. "Gross settlement" means the transaction is settled on one to one basis without bunching or netting with any other transaction. Once processed, payments are final and irrevocable.

Comparatively, ACHs are typically used for low-value, non-urgent transactions while RTGS systems are typically used for high-value, urgent transactions.

Countries and regions have also implemented real-time or instant (or faster) payment systems which typically operate 24x7x365 and perform the transaction from debit of ordering customer's account to credit of beneficiary customer's account within a timeframe of 10–15 seconds.

International

Globalization is driving corporations to transact more frequently across borders. Consumers are also transacting more on a global basis—buying from foreign eCommerce sites as well as traveling, living, and working abroad. For the payments industry, the result is higher volumes of payments—in terms of both currency value and number of transactions. This is also leading to a consequent shift downwards in the average value of these payments

The ways these payments are made can be cumbersome, error prone, and expensive. Payments systems set up decades ago continue to be used sometimes retrofitted, sometimes force-fitted—to meet the needs of modern corporations. And, frequently, the systems creak and groan as they bear the strain. Examples of such systems include STEP2 (an upgrade from 2003), which processes only Euros, and TARGET2 (an upgrade from 2007), which is closed on Saturdays and Sundays and some public holidays.

As of 2014, STEP2 is the only Pan-European automated clearing house (or PE-ACH system) in operation. This type of system is thought to become less relevant as banks will settle their transactions via multiple clearing houses rather than using one central clearing house.

TARGET2 (Trans-European Automated Real-time Gross Settlement Express Transfer System) is a RTGS system that covers the European Union member states which use the euro. It is part of the Eurosystem, which comprises the European Central Bank and the national central banks of those countries that have adopted the euro. TARGET2 is used for the settlement of central bank operations, large-value Euro interbank transfers as well as other euro payments. TARGET 2 provides real-time financial transfers, debt settlement at central banks which is immediate and irreversible.

For users of these systems, on both the paying and receiving sides, it can be difficult and time-consuming to learn how to use cross-border payments tools, and how to set up processes to make optimal use of them. Solution providers (both banks and non-banks) also face challenges cobbling together old systems to meet new demands. For these providers, cross-border payments are both lucrative (especially given foreign exchange conversion revenue) and rewarding, in terms of the overall financial relationship created with the end customer.

The challenges for global payments are not simply those resulting from volume increases. A number of economic, political, and technical factors are changing the types of cross-border transactions conducted. Such factors include:
 Corporations are making more cross-border purchases of services (as opposed to goods), as well as more purchases of complex fabricated parts rather than simple, raw materials.
 Enterprises are purchasing from more countries, in more regions.
 Increased outsourcing is leading to new in-country and new cross-border intracompany transactions.
 More enterprises are participating in complex, automated supply chains, which in some cases drive automatic ordering and fulfillment. Online purchasing continues to grow, both by large enterprises as part of an automated procurement systems and by smaller enterprises purchasing directly.
 There is continued growth in the use of Commuter worker.
 Individuals are increasingly taking their investments abroad.

See also

Aadhaar Enabled Payment System
ATM Industry Association (ATMIA)
Automated clearing house
BankAxept
Bharat Bill Payment System
BHIM
Cheque Truncation System
Clearing
Clearing house
Credit card
Debit card
Direct Deposit
Digital currency
E-commerce credit card payment system
E-commerce payment system
Electronic bill payment
Digital Wallet
Electronic commerce
Electronic funds transfer
Giro
Immediate Payment Service
Interbank Network (ATM / EFT / EFTPOS )
List of on-line payment service providers
National Automated Clearing House
National Common Mobility Card
National Electronic Funds Transfer
NUUP Services
Online banking
Payment card
Payment service provider
Payments as a Service
Real Time Gross Settlement
RuPay
Society for Worldwide Interbank Financial Telecommunication
Structured Financial Messaging System
Systemically Important Payment Systems
Unified Payments Interface
Wire transfer
Automated Teller Machine

References

External links
A Guide to Replacing Legacy Payment Systems 
Inside National Payment Systems
The end of a monopoly - New consumer payment systems.
The Future of Money-Like Things - Past, present, and future overview of consumer payment systems.